Negative transfer may refer to:
 Negative transfer (memory), interference of an existing learned response with learning to respond to a novel, similar stimulus
 Language transfer, interference of one language with learning another
 Internegative, a photographic negative used in motion picture duplication
 Motion picture film scanner, scanning of a motion picture negative to transfer it to a digital video editing system
 Telecine, a motion picture film scanner that operates in real time
 Film-out, transfer of video to a film negative